Middleboro is the name of some places:

Places
In the United States
Middleboro, Indiana
Middleboro, Ohio
Middleborough, Massachusetts (sometimes spelled Middleboro)

Elsewhere
 Middleboro, Nova Scotia, Canada

See also
 Middlesbrough (disambiguation)